The year 1917 in archaeology involved some significant events.

Explorations
 Thomas Gann makes the first detailed description of Maya ruins at Lamanai in British Honduras.

Excavations
 Max Uhle discovers 12 Chinchorro mummies at Morro I, Arica, Chile.
 Religious artefacts discovered beneath the Seven-story Stone Pagoda in Tappyeong-ri, Chungju, Korea.

Publications
Wang Guowei reconstructs a complete Shang dynasty royal genealogy based on the translation of oracle bones from the site of Yinxu.

Births
 14 October: Geoffrey Bibby, English-born archaeologist (d. 2001)
 15 October: Ralph Solecki, American archeologist (d. 2019)
 28 October: Honor Frost, Cyprus-born underwater archaeologist (d. 2010)
 31 January: Sinclair Hood, British classical archaeologist (d. 2021)

Deaths
 15 October: Maxime Collignon, French Classical archaeologist (b. 1849)
 27 October: Worthington George Smith, English illustrator, palaeolithic archaeologist and mycologist (b. 1835)
 22 November: Teoberto Maler, German explorer, archaeologist and writer of accounts of the ruins of the Maya civilization (b. 1842)

References

Archaeology
Archaeology
Archaeology by year